Turkey took part in the Eurovision Song Contest 1989. The country was represented by a music group named Pan with the song "Bana Bana" written and composed by the Timur Selçuk.

Before Eurovision

13. Eurovision Şarkı Yarışması Türkiye Finali 
The final took place on 11 March 1989 at the Ari TV studios in Ankara, hosted by Bülent Özveren and Güler Kazmaci. Sixteen songs competed and the winner was determined by the votes of eight regional juries.

At Eurovision
On the night of the contest Pan performed 5th in the running order following the Netherlands preceding Belgium. At the close of the voting Bana Bana had received only 5 points, placing Turkey 21st among 22. The Turkish jury awarded its 12 points to Yugoslavia.

Voting

References

1989
Countries in the Eurovision Song Contest 1989
Eurovision